The Gibson ES series of semi-acoustic guitars (hollow body electric guitars) are manufactured by the Gibson Guitar Corporation. 

The letters ES stand for Electric Spanish, to distinguish them from Hawaiian-style lap steel guitars which are played flat on the lap. Many of the original numbers referred to the price, in dollars, of the model. Suffixes in the names indicate additional appointments, for example "T" means "thinline" (a thinner profile than most) while "D" means "double pickup". Many of the models come with f-holes, though some, such as B.B. King's signature Lucille series, are made without f-holes. Some models are full-bodied models, while single- and double-cutaways are also available. Two different styles of cutaways are used, both named by Gibson after Italian cities. Florentine models had a sharper, more pointed end on the cutaway, while more rounded and contoured cutaways were called Venetian style.

Numerous signature models of the ES series exist, as well as some later hybrid models such as the "ES-Les Paul" that combines features of a Gibson Les Paul with those of the ES series.

ES Series guitars were built at Gibson's Memphis, Tennessee factory from 2000 until 2019. After Gibson's change of ownership in 2019, the Memphis factory was closed and production was moved back to Nashville, Tennessee.

Models

ES models
 ES-5    (1949–1955)   Three-pickup, full depth hollowbody.  / (1955–1962) ES-5 Switchmaster
 ES-100   (1938–1941)   Entry-level archtop hollow-body model.  (Renamed to ES-125)
 ES-120T (1962–1971)   Most basic student model, thinline
 ES-125   (1941–1970)   Successor of ES-100.  /  (1956–1960) ES-125T (thinline).
 ES-130   (1954–1956)   (Renamed to ES-135)
 ES-135   (1956–1958)   Thick-body version of ES-125TDC.  /  (1991–2002)
 ES-137   (2002–2013)   Upscaled ES-135 with Les Paul sound.
 ES-139   (2013 only)   Semi-hollow dealer exclusive, sized between a Les Paul and ES-135. No f-holes. Marketed as a lighter alternative to the Les Paul.
 ES-140   (1950–1957)   3/4 size, short scale ES-175.  /  (1956–1968) ES-140T (thinline).
 ES-150   (1936–1956)   Gibson's first electric guitar, based on L-50.  /  (1937-?) EST–150 (tenor) and EPG–150 (plectrum) were shipped.  /  (1969–1974) ES-150DC resembling thick ES-335.
 ES-165   (1991–2013)   Single pickup ES-175 based on Herb Ellis's.
 ES-175   (1949–)  Full depth, florentine cutaway, maple top, 24 3/4" scale.  /   (1953-) ES-175D (dual pickup).  /  (1976–1979) ES-175T (thinline hollow-body)

 ES-225T (1955–1959)   Variation on ES-125T (thinline, florentine cutaway), with trapeze bridge.
 ES-250   (1938–1940)   Rare, fancier version of ES-150. Replaced by ES-300.
 ES-260   (1982–1983)   Resembling ES-125T/ES-225T (thinline, florentine cutaway), but semi-hollow with center block, stop tailpiece, and humbuckers instead of P90 pickups.
 ES-295   (1952–1959)   ES-175 resembling Les Paul Goldtop with trapeze bridge.
 ES-300   (1940–1952)   Successor of ES-250, with a slant-mounted long pickup. Short PU in 1941. Reintroduced with P-90 in 1946, added second P-90 in 1949. Replaced by ES-350.
 ES-320TD (1971–1974)   Similar to ES-330TD but with tune-o-matic and metal control plate.
 ES-325   (1972–1979)   Similar to ES-330TD but with mini-humbuckers, single f-hole, and a half-moon shaped plastic control plate
 ES-330TD (1958–)     Double rounded cutaway, thinline hollow-body
 ES-333   (–2003) Stripped-down version of ES-335
 ES-335   (1958–)     World's first thinline archtop semi-acoustic (semi-hollow-body with center-block) / (2013–) ES-335 Bass
 ES-336   (1996–2001)   Replaced by CS-336.
 ES-339   (2007–)     Size of CS-336 with construction of ES-335.
 ES-340TD (1968–1973)   ES-335 with a master volume/mixer and phase switch
 ES-345   (1958–1981)   ES-335 construction, but with parallelogram inlays, Varitone, and stereo outputs.
 ES-347   (1978–)  Alternate ES-345 with a coil-tap switch instead of Varitone
 ES-350   (1947–1956)   Rounded cutaway ES-300.  /  (1955–1981)   ES-350T as a plainer Byrdland.
 ES-355   (1958–1982)   Upscaled ES-345 (ebony fretboard, extra binding, etc.) with vibrato unit, optional Varitone and stereo outputs.
 ES-359   (2008–)     Upscaled ES-339 (ebony fretboard, extra binding, gold hardware, block inlays).
 ES-369   (late 1970s–) ES-335 with Dirty Finger humbuckers, coil tap switch, and snakehead headstock.
 ES-390   (2013–)     Similar in size to the ES-339, but with the fully hollow construction of ES-330. Equipped with mini humbuckers (2013 model year) or dog-ear P90s (2014–present).
 ES-775   (1990–1993)   ES-175 with higher quality components
 ES Artist   (1979–)  Upscale model of ES-335 without f-holes, with active circuit by Moog.

ES signature models
ES-333 signature
 Tom DeLonge Signature ES-333  (2003–)  Equipped with a single high-output Gibson Dirty Fingers bridge humbucker.  
ES-335 signature
 DG-335  (2007–?)  Dave Grohl model based on Trini Lopez.
 Trini Lopez  (1964–1971)  Trini Lopez two versions: one based on ES-335, other similar to Kessel model with diamond-shaped sound holes and a single-side headstock.
Chris Cornell  (2013–)  First edition released in 2013 with a limited edition run of 250 released in 2019 - green Olive Drab finish with Jason Lollar Gretsch Filtertron style Lollartron pickups, Bigsby vibrato, and Cornell's signature inlaid on the headstock
ES-355 derivative signature
 Lucille  (1980–1985)  B.B. King model based on ES-355TD-SV without f-holes.
ES-330/ES-336 derivative signature
Johnny A. (2004–)  ES-336 sized fully-hollow thinline body with sharp double cutaways that resemble the Barney Kessel model with three variants (all models have '57 Classic humbuckers and 25.5" scale unless otherwise noted): 
Signature with Bigsby vibrato
Standard with Bigsby vibrato, which has less cosmetic appointments compared to the Signature, nickel instead of gold hardware, and a rosewood fretboard instead of ebony 
Spruce Top, with a spruce top instead of maple and a stopbar tailpiece instead of a Bigsby vibrato, rosewood fretboard, and Alnico III CustomBuckers instead of '57 Classics

Derived models
 335-S  (1980–1983)  Loosely related solidbody guitar similar  in shape and controls to ES-335 with two Dirty Fingers pickups.
 CS-336  (2001–?)  Custom Shop's first "tonally carved" guitar.
 CS-356  (2001–?)  Upscaled CS-336 with goldplate parts, etc.
Vegas (2006)  Offset semi-hollow with similar aesthetics to the Trini Lopez - non-reverse Firebird six-in-line headstock, diamond f-holes, and split-diamond inlays. Two variants:
Standard - Plain maple top, ebony fingerboard, '57 Classic humbuckers, four finishes: Ebony, Natural, Sunburst, Wine Red. 
High Roller - AAA Flame maple top, gold hardware, block inlays, Burstbucker Pro humbuckers, four finishes: Desert Sunset, Felt Green, Neon, Roulette Red. 

 Les Paul Bantam/Florentine (1995/1996–) Custom Shop models with thinline semi-hollow-body with center-block. (Note: "Gibson USA Florentine" released in 2009 is a solid-body model)
 ES-Les Paul (2014-2016) Mash up of Les Paul and ES-335
 Les Paul Signature  (–)
Midtown (2011–2016)  Smaller chambered body with f-holes that came in five variants:  
Standard with dot inlays and BurstBucker humbuckers, as well as optional Bigsby vibrato  
Standard P-90 with trapezoid inlays and P-90 pickups  
Custom with humbuckers, block inlays and split diamond headstock inlay, like an ES-355 
Kalamazoo, with appointments referencing the Byrdland  
Signature Bass  

 EB–2 bass (1958–1972)
 EB-6 6-string bass/baritone guitar (1959–1961: hollow-body similar to EB–2, 1962–1965: SG-shaped solid-body similar to EB-3/EB-0)

Related models

Origin models
Note: in the 1920s, L-4 and L-5 were once electrified by Lloyd Loar, but halted by his end of contract in 1924.
L-4  (1911–) The bass model of ES-175 and its derivatives.
L-5  (1922–) The bass model of ES-5, Byrdland, ES-350T, possibly ES-225, and these derivatives.
Byrdland  (1955–)  Thinline, short-scale L-5 CES, named after Billy Byrd and Hank Garland.
Super 400 CES ([1934]/1950s–)
L-50 (1934–) The base model of the first Electro Spanish model, ES-150.
The Log (1940) A forerunner of the later center-block semi-hollow models, ES-335/345/355.

Related derivative models
 EDS–1275 Double 12 (1958–) Doubleneck, hollow-body (1958–1962) or SG-shaped solid-body (1962-) guitar with 12 and 6 string guitar necks.Other doubleneck models include:
EMS–1235 Double Mandolin (mandolin or short neck guitar & normal guitar, hollow-body (1958–1962) or solid-body (1962-))
EBSF–1250 Double Bass (4 string bass & guitar, built-in fuzz effect)
EBS–1250 Double Bass (6 string bass & guitar)
EDS–1250 (6 string bass & 4 string bass)
 Barney Kessel  (1961–1974)  Barney Kessel model.  3" deep, double florentine cutaway hollow-body (Two versions, Regular and Custom).
 Johnny Smith  (1961–)  Later renamed as Gibson LeGrande.
Solid Formed (2015) - new style archtop using 1/2 the wood by bending it instead of traditional carving. 17" full hollowbody with a venetian cutaway and floating Johnny Smith style humbucker.
Blueshawk (1996–2006) 
 Little Lucille (1996–2006) another Lucille endorsed by B.B. King.

Related signature models
 Tal Farlow  (1962–1971)  Tal Farlow model.
 Howard Roberts Fusion  (1980–)  Howard Roberts model.
 Chet Atkins Country Gentleman  (1987–2000s) Gibson version of the Gretsch Chet Atkins signature model 6120, with Gibson 492R and 490T humbucking pickups instead of Gretsch Filtertrons. 
 Chet Atkins Tennessean  (1990–2000s) Mid-priced Gibson Chet Atkins signature model designed by Gibson.

Gallery 

This section provides the photographs of the above mentioned models, to easily identify and grasp each one at a glance.

ES models (with signatures and derivations)

Related models

Tree chart

References
Bibliography
 
 
 

Citations

External links

 

ES Series